Hababam Sınıfı  Tatilde is a 1977 Turkish comedy film, directed by Ertem Eğilmez based on a novel by Rıfat Ilgaz, starring Kemal Sunal as a highschool student in a private school which is joined by a new young teacher.

Cast 
 Kemal Sunal as İnek Şaban
 Münir Özkul as Mahmut Hoca
 Tarık Akan as Damat Ferit
 Adile Naşit as Hafize Ana
 Halit Akçatepe as Güdük Necmi
 Ahmet Arıman as Hayta İsmail
 Cem Gürdap as Tulum Hayri
 Feridun Şavlı as Domdom Ali
 Sitki Akçatepe as Paşa Nuri (Physics teacher)
 Ertuğrul Bilda as Külyutmaz Hoca (Biology teacher)
 Kemal Ergüvenç as Kemal Hoca
 Akil Öztuna as Lütfü Hoca (Philosophy teacher)
 Muharrem Gürses as the headmaster

External links
  
 

1977 films
1977 comedy films
Films based on Turkish novels
1970s Turkish-language films
Films set in Turkey
Turkish comedy films
Turkish sequel films
Films set in universities and colleges